The Malecón de Miraflores is an esplanade in the coast of Lima, Peru. It's a major tourist attraction in the city.

Overview
The malecón crosses the district of Miraflores and is composed of three different sectors: the Malecón de la Marina, the Malecón Cisneros, and the Malecón de la Reserva. Another two malecones, 28 de Julio and Balta, separate the Malecón Cisneros from the other two malecones, being connected by the Puente Villena Rey.

The Malecón de la Reserva, the latter of the three malecones, was designed by Augusto Benavides Diez Canseco and features casonas by Ricardo de Jaxa Malachowski.

Landmarks
Larcomar
Costa Verde Highway
Maria Reiche Park
Love Park, location of The Kiss by Víctor Delfín.

Lugar de la Memoria
Puente Villena Rey
Parque Bicentenario

See also
List of tourist attractions in Lima

References

Parks in Peru